Mountain View Cemetery is a cemetery in Fresno, California, opened in the 1880s.

History 
In the early 1880s, Moses J. Church donated 80 acres of land along Belmont Avenue for the establishment of cemeteries. He named the combined plot Mountain View Cemetery but subdivided it and allocated it to a number of groups, such as Catholic, Seventh-Day Adventist, Episcopal, Christian, Masonic, Odd Fellows and many others. No fences were installed between the areas. John S. Eastwood performed the initial survey the property in 1888 as Fresno's City Engineer at the time. The 10-acres of donated land earmarked for the Armenian community became Ararat Cemetery.

Upkeep for the cemetery was assigned to the local Odd Fellows lodge. In 1910, citizens became concerned with plant overgrowth and lack of a map showing ownership of individual plots at the cemetery. They formed the "Mountain View Cemetery Improvement Association" and took over some management duties.

Notable interments

 Frank Hamilton Short (1862-1920), lawyer and a states' rights advocate.
 Bertrand W. Gearhart (1890-1955),  lawyer and politician who served in the United States House of Representatives for California's 9th congressional district.
 Thomas Edwin Hughes (1830-1919), real estate developer and investor who contributed to the initial development of Fresno.
 Dutch Leonard (1892–1952), pitcher in Major League Baseball who had an 11-year career playing for the Boston Red Sox and Detroit Tigers.
 John Samuel Eastwood (1857–1924), dam engineer and pioneer of hydroelectric power production.
 Alma Rubens (1897–1931), film actress and stage performer.
 Moses J. Church (1819-1900), known for building hundreds of miles of canals in the Fresno area, enabling irrigated agriculture using water from the Kings River.
 Fulton G. Berry (1832-1910), businessman and namesake for Fresno's Fulton Mall.
 Josiah Hall, Union army officer.
 Frank Dusy, (1837–1898), early business leader of Selma, California and a co-inventor of the Fresno Scraper.
 Thomas R. Meux, (1838-1929), physician who served early Fresno and builder of the Meux Home, which became a museum.

See also
 List of cemeteries in California

References

Cemeteries in Fresno County, California
Fresno, California